Guo Zhi (1925 – 11 March 2023) was a Chinese politician.

Biography 
He was born in Gaocheng County, Hebei (now Gaocheng District, Shijiazhuang). He joined the Chinese Communist Party (CCP) in 1941. 

He was People's Congress Chairman of his home province. He was a delegate to the 5th National People's Congress (1978–1983), 6th National People's Congress (1983–1988), 7th National People's Congress (1988–1993) and 8th National People's Congress (1993–1998).

Gun died on 11 March 2023, at the age of 98.

References

1925 births
2023 deaths
People's Republic of China politicians from Hebei
Chinese Communist Party politicians from Hebei
People's Congress Chairmen of Hebei
People from Gaocheng District
Guo
Guo
Delegates to the 7th National People's Congress
Delegates to the 8th National People's Congress
Politicians from Shijiazhuang